The Assessment Open Service Interface Definition (OSID)  is an O.K.I. specification which supports creating, organizing, administrating, evaluating, storing and retrieving assessment information. OSIDs are programmatic interfaces which comprise a Service Oriented Architecture for designing and building reusable and interoperable software.

Assessments are organized into Sections and each Section contains one or more Items.   Each Assessment, Section, or Item taken by an Agent can also include an Evaluation.

There may be relationships between this OSID and other OSIDs. For example, an implementation might manage an Assessment's content and questions using the Repository OSID. An Assessment may include optional references to the Course Management and Grading OSIDs.

Software architecture